Ichocollo or Ichucollo (possibly from Aymara jichu ichhu (Peruvian feather grass), qullu mountain)  is a mountain in the Apolobamba mountain range at the border of Bolivia and Peru, about  high. According to the Bolivian IGM (Instituto Geográfico Militar) map and a map edited by the Peruvian Ministry of Education it is located in the La Paz Department, Franz Tamayo Province, Pelechuco Municipality, near . According to reports of mountaineers, however, its position is more to the west on the Peruvian border of the Puno Region, Putina Province, Ananea District, near . This information is based on a DAV (Deutscher Alpenverein) map of 1957.

Statements about the height of Ichocollo also vary considerably.

References 

Mountains of La Paz Department (Bolivia)
Mountains of Peru
International mountains of South America
Bolivia–Peru border
Mountains of Puno Region